Chechen National Okrug was an administrative division (okrug) of the early Russian SFSR, one of the seven national okrugs into which the Mountain Autonomous Soviet Socialist Republic was divided.  It was established on January 21, 1920 and existed until November 30, 1922, when it was separated from the Mountain ASSR as Chechen Autonomous Oblast.

History of Chechnya
States and territories established in 1920
1922 disestablishments